Quantitative may refer to:
 Quantitative research, scientific investigation of quantitative properties
 Quantitative analysis (disambiguation)
 Quantitative verse, a metrical system in poetry
 Statistics, also known as quantitative analysis 
 Numerical data, also known as quantitative data
 Quantification (science)

See also
Qualitative